Adwan (also spelled Adawan or Edwan) is a village in southern Syria, administratively part of the Izra District of the Daraa Governorate. Nearby localities include al-Shaykh Saad to the east, Saham al-Jawlan to the southwest and Tasil to the west. According to the Syria Central Bureau of Statistics, Adwan had a population of 2,487 in the 2004 census.

History
In 1596, Adwan appeared in the Ottoman  tax registers as "'Udwan" and was part of the nahiya of Jawlan Sarqi in the Qada of Hauran. It had an entirely Muslim population consisting of 21 households and 15 bachelors.  The villagers paid a fixed tax-rate of 25% on wheat, barley, summer crops, goats and beehives; a total of 700 akçe.

In the late 19th-century, Adwan was a medium-sized village in territory formerly occupied by the Bedouin Adwan tribe. Its buildings, which included around 40 huts and a few ancient ruins, were mostly built of stone and mud. The village had a population of about 140.

Syrian Civil War

On 9 August 2022, an Iraqi commander of the Islamic State by the name of 'Abo Salim Al-Iraqi' blew himself up after he was besieged by Syrian military forces in the village.

References

Bibliography

External links
  Map of the town, Google Maps 
Kafer el Ma-map, 21K

Populated places in Izra' District